Mystery Hole is located in Ansted, West Virginia, near Hawks Nest State Park and Cathedral Falls in West Virginia. Mystery Hole was founded by Donald Wilson in 1973.

Mystery Hole, immediately adjacent to the Midland Trail (U.S. Route 60) in Fayette County advertises itself as a gravity-defying wonder. It is reminiscent of tourist traps of days gone by. It includes side show-esque attractions such as balls that roll up hill. There is also a Volkswagen Beetle, chopped in half, seemingly crashed into the side of the building.

The Mystery Hole is an underground series of rooms where the walls and floors are built at angles to give the impression that there is something wrong with the gravity in the area. There is one section where water seemingly flows upwards and the tour guide sits on the chair with two legs floating in the air and other two legs supported by the wall.

Soon after founder Donald Wilson closed the attraction in 1996, he died and Mystery Hole was neglected and damaged by vandals.  It has since reopened under new ownership and has been restored to its original kitschy glory.

See also
 Gravity hill

References

External links
 Mystery Hole website

Buildings and structures in Fayette County, West Virginia
Gravity hills
Roadside attractions in West Virginia
Tourist attractions in Fayette County, West Virginia